Julia Greeley, OFS (c. 1833-48 – 7 June 1918), was an African-American philanthropist and Catholic convert. An enslaved woman later freed by the US government, she is known as Denver's "Angel of Charity" because of her aid to countless families in poverty. Her cause for canonization was opened by Archbishop Samuel J. Aquila in 2016.

Biography

Slavery
Greeley was born into slavery in Hannibal, Missouri. At the age of five, her right eye was injured by a slave master as he was whipping her mother. This disfigurement remained with Greeley the rest of her life. She became referred to as "one-eyed Julia".

In 1865, Greeley was freed during the American Civil War, though not by the Emancipation Proclamation (as Missouri was a border state and had to enact its own emancipation laws after the fact).

Greeley moved to Denver and in 1879 became a cook and nanny to Julia Pratte Dickerson of St. Louis, a widow who would later marry William Gilpin—who had been appointed by President Abraham Lincoln as the first territorial Governor of Colorado.

Conversion 
Greeley was baptized into the Catholic Church on June 26, 1880, at Sacred Heart Church in Denver, and became especially devoted to the Most Sacred Heart of Jesus, the Blessed Virgin Mary, and the Holy Eucharist, receiving Holy Communion daily. Despite secretly suffering from painful arthritis, she tirelessly walked the city streets distributing literature from the Sacred Heart League to Catholics and non-Catholics alike.

In 1901, Greeley joined the Secular Franciscans and remained an active member for the rest of her life.

Charity 
Greeley spent the majority of her time helping others and completing church duties. When the Gilpins died, Greeley began to do labor work for a number of wealthy white families. With this money she made, she decided to give it all away to people who needed it. She pulled a red wagon through the streets of Denver in the dark to bring food, coal, clothing, and groceries to needy families. She made her rounds after dark so as not to embarrass white families ashamed to accept charity from a poor, black woman.

One of her major acts of kindness was when she donated her own burial plot for an African American man who died. He was going to be laid into a pauper's grave, but Greeley refused to let it happen. After this, many people began to call her the "colored angel of charity" because of her kindness. Because of all her dedication to families in poverty, she was officially named "Denver's Angel of Charity".

Death 
Greeley died on June 7, 1918 and lay in repose in Loyola Chapel—a first for a Catholic layperson in Denver that has not been repeated. She was then buried in Mount Olivet Cemetery.

Legacy

Possible sainthood 
In January 2014, the Archdiocese of Denver opened an investigation for her canonization.

Greeley is one of the four people that U.S. bishops voted to allow to be investigated for possible sainthood at their fall meeting that year. She joins four other African Americans placed into consideration in recent years, and is the second most recent. Her body was moved to Denver's Cathedral Basilica of the Immaculate Conception in 2017, making her the first person to be interred there since it opened in 1912.

As of May 2021, her inquiry was accepted and validated by the Congregation for the Causes of Saints, and a positio summarizing her life began to be written. Waldery Hilgeman is the Postulator of the cause of canonization.

See also
 History of slavery in Colorado
 List of African American pioneers of Colorado

References

External links
 Julia Greeley Guild official website
 Former slave Julia Greeley first to be buried at Denver's Cathedral

1833 births
1918 deaths
19th-century American slaves
African-American Catholics
American Servants of God
People from Denver
People from Hannibal, Missouri
Catholics from Colorado
Catholics from Missouri
Venerated African-American Catholics
20th-century African-American people